The eastern dwarf tree frog (Litoria fallax), also known as the eastern sedge-frog, is a species of tree frog. It is a small and very common frog and found on the eastern coast of Australia, from around Cairns, Queensland, to around Ulladulla, New South Wales. Individual frogs of this species are often found elsewhere, having been accidentally relocated by transported fruit boxes. Confirmed sightings of breeding pairs have confirmed their survival in Victoria's cooler climate.

Description

This is a small species of frog; females can reach a maximum size of 25–30 mm, while males may only reach 20 mm when fully grown. It is of variable colour (depending upon temperature and colour of surrounding environment), ranging from fawn to light green on top, and occasionally has black flecks on its back. A white line begins under the eye, and joins the white stomach. A brown line begins from the nostril, and continues across the eye, and between the green (or fawn) and white sections on the top and bottom of the body. This species' toe discs are only slightly larger than the toes, and toes are 75% webbed. Some individuals will have an orange posterior thigh. The tadpoles are bigger than the adult frogs, with a size of 30 mm.

Taxonomy 
L. fallax was first described in 1880 by Wilhelm Peters as Hylomantis fallax. The Australian Faunal Directory also considers Hyla bicolor glauerti to be a synonym, with the decision for synonymy being based on Cogger.

Ecology and behaviour
This frog is associated with a wide variety of habitats, including coastal swamps, lagoons, dams, ditches, and garden ponds in forest, heathland, wallum country, and cleared farmland. It lives in reeds and similar plants both near and away from the water, and often inhabits banana trees in the northern areas of Australia, and are sometimes shipped with the bananas throughout Australia. They are known in Australia for becoming lost frogs by turning up in fruit shops outside of their normal range.

Breeding

Breeding occurs at small ponds or dams, which have ample reeds or other emergent vegetation. This species will often breed in temporary water. Its call is a short, high pitched, wr-e-e-ek ip-ip, repeated three or four times. They emit their calls from a single submandibular vocal sac. The males call during the spring and summer seasons, often before and after heavy rain.

About 200-301 eggs are laid at each amplexus, and clumps of spawn contain up to 35 eggs. The minimum tadpole lifespan is 118 days, at a consist temperature of 20 °C. Metamorphosis occurs from January to March, the metamorphs resemble the adults and are very small, only 9–13 mm in length.

Similar species

This species is a member of the dwarf tree frog complex. This species complex is composed of the northern dwarf tree frog (L. bicolor), the Cooloola sedge frog (L. cooloolensis), and the Wallum sedge frog (L. olongburensis), as well as this species. All of these species are similar in size and have a similar ratchet-like call. The species along the east coast often inhabits coastal wallum and acid swamps. Most of these species have more than one common name, with a least one name containing "dwarf tree frog".

As a pet
In Australia, the frog may be kept in captivity with the appropriate permit.

References

Other sources
Article Road: List of All Frog Breeds: Things You Can Do to Ensure Your Frog Has a Long, Happy and Healthy Life: Eastern Dwarf Tree Frog
Anstis, M. 2002. Tadpoles of South-eastern Australia. Reed New Holland: Sydney.
Robinson, M. 2002. A Field Guide to Frogs of Australia. Australian Museum/Reed New Holland: Sydney.

 Frogs Australia Network-frog call available here.
Australian Frogs A Natural History Michael J. Tyler (1994)

Litoria
Amphibians of Queensland
Amphibians of New South Wales
Amphibians described in 1880
Frogs of Australia
Taxa named by Wilhelm Peters